
Elijah 'Tap Tap' Makhatini (born 3 October 1942) is a retired South African middleweight boxer.

Makhatini was born in Eshowe in Zululand in 1942, he started his boxing career in Stanger, Natal in the 1970s.

On 17 August 1974 Makhatini fought in South Africa's first multiracial boxing tournament, this tournament has held at the Rand Stadium in Johannesburg and was promoted by Maurice Toweel. Makhatini fought Juarez de Lima of Brazil, Makhatini won on points.

In 1975 Makhatini faced Emile Griffith the US Virgin Islands boxer in the Orlando Stadium in Soweto and beat him on points.

He was awarded the Order of Ikhamanga in silver for boxing.

References

Citations

Sources

Further reading

1942 births
Living people
South African male boxers
Middleweight boxers